The 2008 Women's Youth World Handball Championship was the 2nd edition of the tournament and took place in the Bratislava, Slovakia, from 11 to 20 July 2008.

Russian Federation won the final against Serbia by 27–22.

Draw

Group A

Group B

Group C

Group D

Main round

Group M I 

  In Sibamac Arena, Bratislava

Group M II 

  In Sibamac Arena, Bratislava

Placement round

Group P I 

  In Sports Hall Pasienky, Bratislava

Group P II 

  In Sports Hall Pasienky, Bratislava

Placement matches

15/16-place match

13/14-place match

11/12-place match

9/10-place match

7/8-place match

5/6-place match

Semifinals / knockout stage

Semifinal matches

Bronze-medal match

Gold-medal match

Final standings

Awards

External links 
 Official website

2006 Women's Youth World Handball Championship
Women's Youth World Handball Championship
Women's Youth World Handball Championship
2008
Women's handball in Slovakia
Youth World Handball Championship